Holiday with You is a 2012 Christmas album by Swedish singer Pernilla Wahlgren.

Track listing

References 

2012 Christmas albums
Christmas albums by Swedish artists
Pop Christmas albums
Pernilla Wahlgren albums
Swedish-language albums